This is a list of airports in Albania, grouped by type and sorted by location.

A number of regional airports have been renovated but cannot become functional for civil flights because of the 20 year monopoly held by Tirana International Airport's shareholder company over Albanian airspace that started in 2005. Following intensive negotiations to revise the contract terms to open airports for both domestic and external flights earlier, the Albanian government managed to reduce the concession period by 5 years, until 2020. After reaching the agreement with the Albanian Government to end its monopoly on international flights from Albania, Hochtief AirPort sold the operation of TIA to China Everbright Limited. However, in December of 2020 Kastrati group took over the concession of the airport from China Everbright Limited for 71 million euros.

Airports, airfields and aerodromes

Airport names shown in bold indicate the airport has scheduled service on commercial airlines.
Airport names shown in italic indicate the airport has approved for construction.

Statistics

Passenger statistics 
Statistics data for all International airports in Albania.

See also 
 Transport in Albania
 Albanian Air Force
 List of airports by ICAO code: L#LA – Albania
 Wikipedia: WikiProject Aviation/Airline destination lists: Europe#Albania

References 

 
 
  – includes IATA codes
  – IATA codes, ICAO codes and coordinates
  – ICAO codes and coordinates

 
Albania
Airports
Airports
Albania